Charles Flaherty may refer to:
 Charles Flaherty (alpine skier) (born 2000), alpine skier for Puerto Rico
 Charles Flaherty (politician) (born 1938), American politician in Massachusetts